Good Heavens is an ABC comedy anthology series produced by Columbia Pictures Television that aired between February 29 and June 26, 1976. It ranked #17 in the Nielsen ratings during the 1975-76 television season.

The main character was Mr. Angel (Carl Reiner), an emissary of heaven who came down to Earth to grant wishes to those who had performed a good deed. Episodes featured actors such as Don Ameche, Susan Dey, Sandy Duncan, Pat Harrington Jr., Florence Henderson, Alex Karras, Penny Marshall, Hugh O'Brian, Loretta Swit, Brenda Vaccaro, and Fred Willard.

Episodes

References

External links
Good Heavens at Archive of American Television

American Broadcasting Company original programming
American fantasy television series
1970s American anthology television series
Angels in television
Television series by Sony Pictures Television
1970s American sitcoms
1976 American television series debuts
1976 American television series endings
Television shows set in New York City